This is a list of NIU Huskies football players in the NFL Draft.

Key

Selections

References

Northern Illinois

Northern Illinois Huskies NFL Draft